Pteridiospora spinosispora is a species of fungus in the class Dothideomycetes.

Taxonomy
The fungus was discovered in 1963, isolated from the mycorrhizae of sweetgum (Liquidambar styraciflua). The type locality was near the Mississippi River in northern Mississippi; it was later reported growing with the roots of green ash (Fraxinus pennsylvanica). The species was first mentioned in a 1966 report, where it was described as an "unidentified sphaeriaceous ascomycete". Filer formally described the fungus in 1969.

Description
The fruitbodies of the fungus are small, dull black, and spherical, measuring 114–251 by 114–251 μm, with thick walls (up to 24 μm); They occur singly or in dense groups. Underlying the fruitbodies is a small, thin-walled mat of mycelium. The club-shaped asci (spore-bearing cells) measure 85 by 25 μm. The ascospores are black and spiny, measuring 21–25 by 12–20 μm (with the spines 2–5 μm); they contain a single septum. The ornamented spores clearly distinguish P. spinosispora from other members of Pteridiospora.

References

External links

Dothideomycetes enigmatic taxa
Fungi described in 1969
Fungi of the United States
Fungi without expected TNC conservation status